Rivermont is a historic home located at Lynchburg, Virginia.  It is a two-story Greek Revival frame house completed in 1852 and located within the Daniel's Hill Historic District. It was built for Judge William Daniel Jr. (1806–1873) and his second wife, Elizabeth Hannah Cabell (1811–1892).  In 1997 the Lynchburg Redevelopment and Housing Authority gained title to the property and donated it to The Rivermont House, Inc.

It was listed on the National Register of Historic Places in 2000.

References

Rivermont is one of Lynchburg's most important antebellum mansions.    It was completed in 1852, during the year the U.S. Census declared the city to be the second-wealthiest in the country. The handsome Greek Revival mansion is located on F Street, just off Cabell Street, the main thoroughfare of Daniel's Hill.  Rivermont follows the pattern of the few Lynchburg Greek Revival houses of the 1840s and 1850s in several respects: It has a three bay facade, is raised on a high basement, has a hipped roof, and a one-story portico centered on the facade. It differs from the normal pattern in Lynchburg in that it is made of frame rather than brick and its huge windows on the facade are unique—each is a triple composition with a central panel flanked by sidelights. Their monumental scale and sash are spectacular and were obviously designed to take advantage of the sweeping views down the James River. In Lynchburg, the other best examples of the Greek Revival style are the Edward Murrell House in Garland Hill on Madison and Second Streets.  It was built in 1859 and was made of brick.  And the City Court House, also a Greek Revival style structure built between 1853 and 1855.  
Rivermont is 48' wide  x 38' deep with a ground floor, main floor and second floor.  It has four internal brick chimneys and the raised foundation is brick, which was later covered with stucco. Other external details include a dentil cornice and a front entry with transom and sidelights. A one-story portico protected this entrance centered on the facade. Its columns were of the delicate "Temple (Tower) of the Winds" pattern, a variant of the Corinthian Order that was used only occasionally in Greek Revival architecture, generally for the finest buildings employing the style. Corinthian columns are adapted from the Choregic Monument of Lysikrates in Athens, c. 334 B.C. The portico has been restored.
The interior features a two-room deep center passage plan with high-ceilinged rooms of generous proportions.  The main floor has ceilings over 12 feet tall, the second floor has ceilings that are 9 feet tall and the ground level has 8 foot ceilings.  The enter passage features a wide two-run stair with turned newel posts, balusters, and a thick continuous mahogany hand rail. Walls and ceilings have plaster finishes, except for three rooms on the ground floor which have brick walls.

Doors and windows have molded surrounds, and doors are four panel. Surviving original mantels have simple Greek Revival pilaster and frieze compositions although some have battered jambs with eared friezes. Also in the house are two c. 1900 two stage mantels with colonnettes. Under the large windows in the three downstairs rooms are paneled aprons.   The west rooms are connected by pocket doors. The chimneys rise from the ground level to the second story and there is a fireplace in each room.
Rivermont was built by Lynchburg contractors Bailey and Lanahan, who had
undertaken the second St. Paul's Episcopal Church at 7th & Church Streets a year earlier. They also built the second Presbyterian Church at the corner of 9th and Church Streets, which was demolished in 1931.   And, they built the Rucker house in 1867 at the corner of 7th and Clay streets. It was unfortunately taken down in 1887 to build the third St. Paul's church.
Fortunately, we still have Bailey and Lanahan's hand-written building specifications that describe in detail all of the interior and exterior of Rivermont. They also called for the construction of a smokehouse and kitchen building. The plans reference design elements taken from William Ranlett's architectural pattern book called The American Architect: A series of Original Designs for Domestic and Ornamental Cottages and Villas.  Here are several slides of the actual pattern that was used to design the Rivermont House.  We know that the on the roof of Rivermont there used to be  two balustrades, one near the eaves and one at the apex, just like the pattern shows.  We did not replace those balustrades but hope they can be added in the future. 
The hand written specifications were signed by William Daniel, the owner, in 1848. The plans called for a first floor bedroom with an adjoining bathing room and dressing room, which is an unusual convenience for this era.  There was a stairway from the ground floor hall up to the main floor and another stair from the main floor to the second floor.   There was also a small stairway in the passage between the bathing and drawing room to the second floor.  The floors on the main and second floor are made of "secret laid" kiln.  There are four bedrooms upstairs. The plans called for Venetian blinds in all rooms.   On the ground level, we find the dining room and living area for the family. The floors in the ground level hall and dining room were made of flagging and in the other ground level rooms the floors were brick. Aside from the front porch, which is described in detail, there was also a back porch with turned columns that was 28'x 8'.  The smokehouse was to be 12x14 with 12 foot ceilings and framed with weather board.  The kitchen was 16 x 32 with a chimney in the center and was framed with weatherboard.  It had four fireplaces, two above and two below and a small window in each gable. The main house was to receive 3 coats of paint and the kitchen and smokehouse were to receive 2 coats of paint. 
Rivermont's structure is of balloon frame construction, which was generally not employed in this area of the country until much later. This early example of balloon frame construction is one of the main reasons the Rivermont House is on the National Register of Historic Places. Balloon frame construction was first documented in the Chicago area in 1833, where Augustine Taylor built the Saint Mary's Church.  Taylor eliminated the old mortised beams and fittings and replaced them with light 2x4s and 2x6s set close together. Wood studs extend in one piece from the top of the foundation sill plate to the top roof plate.  Floor joists are nailed to the studs and are supported with horizontal boards.  Taylor used these studs and cross members and held the whole thing together with nails, no joints.  Balloon frame construction, which would be better described as basket weave construction, proved to be incredibly sturdy, light, flexible and tough.  Stresses were taken throughout the structure and there are stories of tornadoes knocking balloon frame houses off their foundations with the houses rolling away unbroken like tumbleweeds.  These buildings can be easily moved on a flat bed truck.

Rivermont was built by Judge William Daniel, Jr. for his second wife, Elizabeth Cabell of Richmond. They were married in 1850. Before this he was married to Sarah Warwick and they had a son, John Warwick Daniel (who later came to be known as the Lame Lion of Lynchburg and was a high ranking U.S. Senator), and a daughter. When William Daniel was married to Sarah, he lived in Point of Honor, which he inherited upon his father's death in 1839. The problem was, when his father died, a large portion of his money went to William's sisters, so William did not have enough money to run Point of Honor as a working plantation. He had to get rid of most of his slaves and had financial trouble. His wife Sarah and their children quite often stayed "in town" on Court Street at Sarah's parent's house (the Warwick House). They felt Point of Honor was too far out in the country. In 1845, Sarah died (possibly in childbirth). William was unable to take proper care of his children by himself, so they lived with Sarah's parents on Court Street. William then offered the large Point of Honor tract of land for sale in 1845. He was willing to sell it as one estate or to break it (around 800 acres plus the dwelling house) into lots. It was at this time that Daniel's Hill was created and Cabell Street became the main thoroughfare. William leased Point of Honor for a number of years and the finally sold it in 1862 to the Owen family.
William was very active in politics. He served as a Judge of Lynchburg's General Court in the 1820s and was elected to the House of Delegates in 1831 before he was 25. He served three terms. In 1846 he was elected to the Supreme Court of Appeals of Virginia and served until the Civil War. Daniel was also instrumental in organizing the Lynchburg-based Virginia and Tennessee Railroad.
William must have met Elizabeth Cabell while spending time in Richmond in the House of Delegates. Elizabeth was the sister of his law partner Henry Colter Cabell. When he married her, he hoped for a happy life with a mother for his children. He used the highest piece of land in Daniel's Hill to build Rivermont. Elizabeth is credited with naming the house. Unfortunately, Elizabeth was miserable in Lynchburg and she didn't really like William Daniel, either. They never had any children. Their relationship is documented in letters from Elvira Daniel Ellet, William's sister, who visited William quite often. She was married to Col. Charles Ellet, the distinguished civil engineer and chief engineer of the James River and Kanawha Canal. Charles Ellet had to travel extensively, leaving Elvira alone for long spells. To fill the time, she would visit William at Rivermont.   The University of Michigan houses the "Ellet Papers" and the Lynchburg Museum System sent Martha Terrell Harris Burruss to Ann Arbor to research the papers and document references to Lynchburg.   Following are some excerpts from Elvira's letters to Charles regarding William, his marriage and Rivermont:
•	Elvira, formerly blaming her brother, not seems to pity him as she writes "poor brother looks wild, haggard, and unhappy in the extreme, but seems to be doing as nearly as he can what is right."
•	On Feb. 2, 1852 she writes:  "Brother's wife is in a wretched condition…She is acting in a way the best calculated to ruin both herself and her husband."  Elvira says Mrs. Cabell, Elizabeth's mother is a problem and she does not lay the blame on her brother.
•	On February 7, 1852, she writes further news of William's marital difficulties including an interfering mother-in-law when she says "My impression is that she was disappointed and chagrined, and having really no affection for her husband, allowed him to see it too.  He has always said his transient derangement was produced by his discovery of her want of affection for him."  Elvira reports that Mrs. Cabell thinks her daughter is a martyr and sleeps with her, making William sleep in the dressing room.
•	On March 3, 1852, Elvira reports that "Brother's wife has determined not to accompany him to Lynchburg, where he will remain two or three weeks alone, exposed to temptation, which I fear he never resists there in consequence of his entire loneliness.  The election for his office will take place in April and Mr. Bouldin says a frolic at this time would cause his certain defeat."  Elvira decides to go to Lynchburg with her brother at this time because she has some influence over him.
•	On March 8, 1852, Elvira and William arrive at Rivermont.  Elvira will stay for a month and it is the first time she has seen his new house.  Of the house she says, "The view from this house is the most extensive and beautiful one that I remember anywhere.  The position is far superior to that occupied by the old house (Point of Honor) and when the trees grow, which have been planted out, nothing will be wanting to make it one of the most delightful and elegant homes that could well be imagined.  The view is even more beautiful than my memory made it."  She then referred to seeing the mountains she used to watch when she was a girl and the memories of seeing the approach of heavy rains.  It took several hours to heat up Rivermont with wood fires when they first arrived.  William had horses and a carriage for them to use.  
•	On March 10, 1852, Elvira reports to her husband again that the view is magnificent.  She says the house is very pretty and convenient and exceedingly cheerful having so much light from the numerous large windows in all the rooms.  She says the greatest defect is that it was built for the summertime or for a very warm climate.  Just now, though, she says it is very comfortable with large wood fires in all the rooms they use.  She says William is unhappy and that she still doesn't understand his position with regard to his wife and that there is some mystery there.  William is worried about the upcoming election because Judge Mason in running against him. 
•	On March 12, 1852, Elvira writes that the children are playing in the clover fields around Rivermont.  She says Rivermont is in a rather lonely situation and that they are too far out of town to see many visitors. 
•	On May 15, 1853, a year later, Elvira writes to her husband the following. "From all accounts Brother's wife must be on the brink of insanity.  Who would have dreamed of such a fate for one so petted and idolized.  I sincerely believe that if she could be removed altogether from her Mother's influence that she would be more likely to return to a healthy condition."
In 1867, after the Civil War, William Daniel lost everything and was forced to declare bankruptcy. Anyone working as part of the Confederate government was forced out after the war. He died in 1873. According to historian W. Asbury Christian, William's "great legal acquirements and the soundness of his judicial opinions gave his decisions a place with the foremost in the records of Virginia."
A much happier era in Rivermont history began in 1874, when Rivermont was sold by the estate of William Daniel to Edward Sixtus Hutter and his wife Nannie Francis Langhorne Hutter. Edward was the son of Major George Christian Hutter, who was paymaster in the United States navy and lived at "Sandusky." His mother was Miss Harriet Risque Hutter. Nannie Hutter was the daughter of Major John S. and Elizabeth Dabney Langhorne. Edward and Nannie had 13 children, 5 of whom died young, so there was a big happy family growing up at Rivermont during the last half of the 19th century. Edward Sixtus was educated at VMI and later served in the Civil War as a staff person for Jeb Stuart.    He was in charge of the arsenal in Danville during the last half of the war. After the war he worked for his father-in-law in the insurance business and then, after moving to Rivermont, took up the profession of Civil engineering, which he had learned at VMI.    According to Al Chambers, "he took the name "Rivermont" and ran with it." He sold off portions of his Rivermont estate to create "Danielstown," a working-class neighborhood. Danielstown was one of the first signs of post war prosperity in Lynchburg. Then, Hutter helped form the "Rivermont Company," Lynchburg's largest real estate venture of the 1880-1890s boom era, the era of the "New South." Edward Hutter helped design the Rivermont Bridge that spanned Blackwater Creek at a height "within three feet of the height of the suspension bridge at Brooklyn." the bridge provided access to the new suburb and to Rivermont Avenue, which Hutter platted in generous, sweeping curves following the dictates of topography. He also laid out the lots of the new development and named it, along with the bridge and the avenue, after his home, Rivermont.  Several years after this boom fizzled out, Edward Hutter pursued the development of iron mines with his son E. Risque Hutter.  During his time in Rivermont House he must have hosted a number of elegant parties.  One that we know about is his daughter's wedding on April 2, 1902.  We got a copy of their wedding write-up in the paper from Phyllis Workman, a Hutter descendant, as well as this photo of the big day.  Here are some notes on the wedding from that article.

MARRIED AT ST. PAUL'S on April 2, 1902,
Miss Lucy Boyd Hutter Becomes the
Bride of Mr. T. Rush Ragland
One of the most interesting marriages that has been chronicled in Lynchburg in recent years was that of Miss Lucy Boyd Hutter, daughter of Major Edward S. Hutter, and Mr. T. Rush Ragland, of Kanawha, WV, which took place at St. Paul's Episcopal Church. The popularity of the bride in Lynchburg was attested by an immense assemblage which not only filled every seat, but taxed the capacity of standing room.
Wedding party members included Miss Mary Christian, Miss Elizabeth Lewis, Miss Nina Armistead, Miss Mazie Hutter, Miss Norvie Craighill, Miss Ruby Hanmer, Miss Fannie Cheatwood, and Miss Evelyn Early. Ushers were Messrs. George Lancaster, G.O. Howard, and Forest Scales, of Holcombe Rock, and C.S. Hutter, D.A. Payne, and Dexter Otey, of Lynchburg. The ushers were followed by eight groomsmen  Messers. E.R. Hutter, R.T. Watts, Samuel Adams, R.C. Blackford, Keene Langhorne and Henry Johnson, of Lynchburg: Robert Rose, of New York, and Colonel Joseph Button, of Richmond. Bridesmaids were exquisitely gowned in white mousseline and lace trimmings over taffeta with large white picture hats and long gloves, and carried bunches of maiden hair fern. The two maids of honor, Miss Edna Hutter, sister of the bride, and Miss Florence Langhorne, of Campbell County, were handsomely and becomingly gowned in white mousseline over white taffeta and wore large white chiffon hats with pink roses and carried la France roses.
The bride followed the maids of honor, and proceeded up the aisle on the arm of her father. She wore an elegant and lovely bridal costume of heavy white satin with white chiffon over dress and point lace, with a long veil caught with a cluster of dainty orange
blossoms, and carried a bunch of graceful Easter lilies. On reaching the foot of the chancel steps, the bride was joined by the groom, who had approached from the vestry room accompanied by his best man, Mr. Marion Scales, of New York.
From the church the party repaired to the home of the bride's parents on Daniel's Hill, where an elaborate bridal breakfast was served. The gracious hospitality never presented a fairer appearance The young couple received the guests in the large hall, and later the company adjourned to the spacious drawing rooms, where the breakfast tables were spread. The bridal party was seated at a large circular table, exquisitely decorated with Easter lilies and garlands of smilax. Many candles in silver candelabra shed their light on the beautiful scene, and after a delicious menu had been served, the bride's cake was cut amid much mirth and eagerness.
When Edward Sixtus Hutter died in June 1904 his obituary summarized his personality as follows:  Edward Hutter "was a man of splendid personality and unusual amiability. His great business sagacity and intelligence was recognized and admitted by all who knew him. Everything he applied himself to he did well. He was charming in manner and of a generous and kindly disposition and was warmly beloved and admire by all who knew him."
When his wife, Nannie Langhorne died in 1907, she had an equally glowing obituary: "A child of unusual brightness and promise, she early developed into a brilliant and fascinating woman, and many still recall with appreciative affection and admiration "Miss Nannie Jack Langhorne" in the bloom of her beautiful girlhood, her charm of manner, quick wit and lovely gift of song, which made her a center of attraction on every occasion graced by her presence. As a writer, her style was easy, bright and humorous, and her magazine articles and letters to the papers were always read with interest and amusement. A little book of poems also, published in 1898, contains some very sweet and tuneful lyrics."

After the Hutter occupancy of Rivermont, the house was sold 11 times. It eventually became a run-down apartment building. It was chopped into apartments by the addition of partitions to divide each floor into at least two apartments. It was in this condition that the Lynchburg Redevelopment and Housing Authority took possession of it by eminent domain in 1996 and asked the Lynchburg Historical Foundation for help in creating a non-profit entity to oversee its restoration. Paul Barringer, now deceased, was one of the main commissioners of the Housing Authority who thought the house should be saved.  Rivermont House, Inc. became a non-profit entity in September 1997. The House was sold by Rivermont House, Inc. in 2010 to a private individual and is being restored as a private residence.

Houses on the National Register of Historic Places in Virginia
Houses completed in 1852
Greek Revival houses in Virginia
Houses in Lynchburg, Virginia
National Register of Historic Places in Lynchburg, Virginia
1852 establishments in Virginia